What Another Man Spills is the fourth studio album by American rock band Lambchop, released in 1998 by Merge Records. The cover art was drawn by Vic Chesnutt.

Track listing
All songs written by Kurt Wagner except where noted.
 "Interrupted" - 6:08
 "The Saturday Option" - 4:38
 "Shucks" - 5:11
 "Give Me Your Love (Love Song)" (Curtis Mayfield) - 5:15
 "Life #2" (F.M. Cornog) - 4:41
 "Scamper" - 6:21
 "It's Not Alright" (James McNew) - 3:26
 "N.O." - 4:26
 "I've Been Lonely for So Long" (Posie Knight, Jerry Weaver) - 4:40
 "Magnificent Obsession" - 3:20
 "King of Nothing Never" (F.M. Cornog) - 4:07
 "The Theme from the Neil Miller Show" (Marc Trovillion) - 2:45

References

1998 albums
Lambchop (band) albums
Merge Records albums